A region is arid when it severely lacks available water, to the extent of hindering or preventing the growth and development of plant and animal life. Regions with arid climates tend to lack vegetation and are called xeric or desertic. Most arid climates straddle the Equator; these regions include parts of Africa, Asia, South America, North America, and Australia.

Change over time 

The distribution of aridity at any time is largely the result of the general circulation of the atmosphere. The latter does change significantly over time through climate change. For example, temperature increase by 1.5–2.1 percent across the Nile Basin over the next 30–40 years could change the region from semi-arid to arid, significantly reducing the land usable for agriculture. In addition, changes in land use can increase demands on soil water and thereby increase aridity.

See also 

 Arid Forest Research Institute
 Aridity index
 Desert climate
 Desiccation tolerance
 Drought
 Humidity
 Vapor pressure

References 

 Griffiths, J. F. (1985) 'Climatology', Chapter 2 in Handbook of Applied Meteorology, Edited by David D. Houghton, John Wiley and Sons, .
 Durrenberger, R. W. (1987) 'Arid Climates', article in The Encyclopedia of Climatology, p. 92–101, Edited by J. E. Oliver and R. W. Fairbridge, Van Nostrand Reinhold Company, New York, .
 Stadler, S. J (1987) 'Aridity Indexes', article in The Encyclopedia of Climatology, p. 102–107, Edited by J. E. Oliver and R. W. Fairbridge, Van Nostrand Reinhold Company, New York, .
 Blue Peace for the Nile Report, 2009, Strategic Foresight Group

Climate patterns
Soil science
Water scarcity